Ab Konar (also Romanized as Āb Konār; also known as Chehel Konār) is a village in Tashan-e Gharbi Rural District, Tashan District, Behbahan County, Khuzestan Province, Iran. At the 2006 census, its population was 134, in 26 families.

References 

Populated places in Behbahan County